The Struma disaster was the sinking on 24 February 1942 of a ship, which had been trying to take nearly 800 Jewish refugees from the Axis member Romania to Mandatory Palestine. She was a small iron-hulled ship of only  and had been built in 1867 as a steam-powered schooner but had recently been re-engined with an unreliable second-hand diesel engine.

Strumas diesel engine failed several times between her departure from Constanţa on the Black Sea on 12 December 1941 and her arrival in Istanbul on 15 December. She had to be towed by a tug boat to leave Constanţa and to enter Istanbul. On 23 February 1942, with her engine still inoperable and her refugee passengers aboard, Turkish authorities towed Struma from Istanbul through the Bosphorus out to the coast of Şile, in North Istanbul. Within hours, on the morning of 24 February, the  torpedoed her, killing 781 refugees and 10 crew, which made it the Black Sea's largest exclusively-civilian naval disaster of World War II. Until recently, the number of victims had been estimated at 768, but the current figure is the result of a recent study of six different passenger lists. Only one person aboard, the 19-year-old David Stoliar, survived (he died in 2014).

The Struma disaster joined that of SS Patria, which was sunk after Haganah sabotage while she was laden with Jewish refugees 15 months earlier, as rallying points for the Irgun and Lehi revisionist Zionist clandestine movements, encouraging their campaign against the British colonial government.

Voyage and detention

Struma had been built as a luxury yacht but was 74 years old. In the 1930s, she had been relegated to carrying cattle on the Danube River under the flag of convenience of Panama. The Mossad LeAliyah Bet intended to use her as a refugee ship but shelved the plan after the Germans had entered Bulgaria. Her Greek owner, Jean D. Pandelis, instead contacted Revisionist Zionists in Romania. The New Zionist Organization and a Zionist youth movement, Betar, began to make arrangements, but an argument over the choice of passengers left the planning in the hands of Betar.

Apart from the crew and 60 Betar youth, there were over 700 passengers, who had paid large fees to board the ship. The exact number is not certain, but a collation of six separate lists produced a total of 791 passengers and 10 crew. Passengers were told they would be sailing on a renovated boat with a short stop in Istanbul to collect their Palestinian immigration visas. Romanian Prime Minister Ion Antonescu's government approved of the voyage.

Each refugee was allowed to take  of luggage. Romanian customs officers took many of the refugees' valuables and other possessions, along with food that they had brought with them. The passengers were not permitted to see the vessel before the day of the voyage. They found that she was a wreck with only two lifeboats. Below decks, Struma had dormitories with bunks for 40 to 120 people in each.

On 12 December 1941, the day of her sailing, Strumas engine failed and so a tug towed her out of the port of Constanţa. Since the waters off Constanţa were mined, a Romanian vessel escorted her clear of the minefield. She then drifted overnight while her crew tried vainly to start her engine. She transmitted distress signals, and on 13 December, the Romanian tug returned. The tug's crew said they would not repair Strumas engine unless it was paid. The refugees had no money after they had bought their tickets and leaving Romania and so they gave all their wedding rings to the tugboatmen, who then repaired the engine. Struma then got under way, but by 15 December, her engine had failed again and so she was towed into the port of Istanbul, Turkey.

There, she remained at anchor, while British diplomats and Turkish officials negotiated over the fate of the passengers. Because of Arab and Jewish unrest in Palestine, the British government was determined to apply the terms of the White Paper of 1939 to minimise Jewish immigration to Palestine. British diplomats urged the Turkish government of Refik Saydam to prevent Struma from continuing her voyage. Turkey refused to allow the passengers to disembark. While she was detained in Istanbul, Struma ran short of food. Soup was cooked twice a week, and supper was typically an orange and some peanuts for each person. At night, each child was issued a serving of milk.

After weeks of negotiation, the British government agreed to honour the expired Palestinian visas that were possessed by a few passengers, who were allowed to continue to Palestine overland. With the help of influential friends (Vehbi Koc), a few others also managed to escape. One woman, Madeea Solomonovici, was admitted to an Istanbul hospital after she had miscarried. On 12 February, British officials agreed that children from 11 to 16 on the ship would be given Palestinian visas, but a dispute occurred over their transportation to Palestine. Britain declined to send a ship, and Turkey refused to allow them to travel overland. According to some researchers, a total of 9 passengers disembarked, and the remaining 782 and 10 crew stayed on the ship. Others believe that there had only been 782 passengers initially, with molt Solomonovici being allowed to leave the ship.

Towing to sea and sinking

Negotiations between Turkey and Britain seemed to reach an impasse. On 23 February 1942, a small party from the Turkish police tried to board the ship, but the refugees would not let it aboard. A larger force of about 80 police officers came then surrounded Struma with motor boats, and after about half an hour of resistance, it boarded the ship. The police detached the ship's anchor and attached her to a tug, which towed her through the Bosphorus and out into the Black Sea. As she was towed along the Bosphorus, many passengers hung signs over the sides that read "SAVE US" in English and Hebrew that were visible to those who lived on the banks of the strait. Despite weeks of work by Turkish engineers, the engine would not start. The Turkish authorities abandoned the ship in the Black Sea, about 10 miles north of the Bosphorus, where she drifted helplessly.

On the morning of 24 February there was a huge explosion, and the ship sank.

Struma sank quickly, and many people were trapped below decks and drowned. Many others aboard survived the sinking and clung to pieces of wreckage, but for hours, no rescue came, and all but one of them died from drowning or hypothermia. Of the estimated 791 people killed, more than 100 were children. Strumas First Officer Lazar Dikof and the 19-year-old refugee David Stoliar clung to a cabin door, which was floating in the sea. The First Officer died overnight, but Turks in a rowing boat rescued Stoliar the next day. He was the only survivor.

Turkey held Stoliar in custody for many weeks. Simon Brod (1893–1962), a Jewish businessman from Istanbul who during World War II helped to rescue an untold number of Jewish refugees who reached Turkey, arranged for Stoliar's meals during his two-month incarceration. Upon his release, Brod brought Stoliar home. He provided him with clothes, a suitcase and a train ticket to Aleppo after the British government had given him papers to go to Palestine.

Aftermath

On 9 June 1942, Lord Wedgwood opened the debate in the House of Lords by alleging that the British government had reneged on its commitments and urging for the League of Nations mandate over Palestine to be transferred to the United States. He stated with bitterness: "I hope yet to live to see those who sent the Struma cargo back to the Nazis hung as high as Haman cheek by jowl with their prototype and Führer, Adolf Hitler". Anglo-Jewish poet Emanuel Litvinoff, serving in the British Army at the time, wrote a scathing poem mourning the loss of Struma. Having volunteered in the British Army to fight the Nazis, he called the British uniform he wore a "badge of shame" in response to the incident.

For many years, there were competing theories about the explosion that sank Struma. In 1964, a German historian discovered that Shch-213 had fired a torpedo, which sank the ship. That was later confirmed from several other Soviet sources. The submarine had been acting under secret orders to sink all neutral and enemy shipping entering the Black Sea to reduce the flow of strategic material to Nazi Germany.

Frantz and Collins call the sinking of Struma the "largest naval civilian disaster of the war". Greater numbers of civilians perished in other maritime disasters of the war, including Wilhelm Gustloff, Cap Arcona and Junyō Maru, but there were also military personnel aboard those ships at the time.

On 26 January 2005, Israel Prime Minister Ariel Sharon, told the Knesset:

Wrecks

Struma
In July 2000, a Turkish diving team found a wreck on the sea floor in about the right place and announced that it had found Struma. A team, led by a British technical diver and a grandson of one of the victims, Greg Buxton, later studied that and several other wrecks in the area but could not positively identify any as Struma since the wreck that had been found by the Turks was far too large.

On 3 September 2000, a ceremony was held at the site to commemorate the tragedy. It was attended by 60 relatives of Struma victims, representatives of the Jewish community of Turkey, the Israeli ambassador and prime minister's envoy and British and American delegates, but David Stoliar chose to not attend for family reasons.

Soviet Shch-213 submarine
In November 2008, a team of Dutch, German and Romanian divers of the Black Sea Wreck Diving Club discovered the wreck of Shch-213 off the coast of Constanţa in Romania. Since the registration markings that could have helped to identify the wreck were missing because of damage to the submarine, it took divers until 2010 to identify her as Shch-213.

See also
Lord Moyne
 – a former US packet ship carrying 4,515 Jewish refugees who were denied entry to Palestine in 1947.
 – a Turkish ship carrying 350 Jewish refugees that was torpedoed and sunk on 5 August 1944 by USSR submarine Shch 215
 – a Spanish cargo liner designed for 28 passengers that took 1,120 Jewish refugees to New York in a seven-week voyage in 1941.
 – a German passenger liner carrying 937 Jewish refugees who were denied entry to Cuba, the USA and Canada in 1939.
Le Grand Akshan
List by death toll of ships sunk by submarines

References

Sources

External links

 (Incomplete list of victims)
 MV Struma disaster on Yad Vashem website

The Holocaust in Bulgaria
History of the Republic of Turkey
The Holocaust in Romania
Maritime disasters
International response to the Holocaust
Israel–Turkey relations
Jewish immigrant ships
Jewish Romanian history
Maritime incidents in February 1942
Romania in World War II
Romanian emigrants to Mandatory Palestine
Ships sunk by Soviet submarines
World War II shipwrecks in the Black Sea
The Holocaust in Bessarabia and Bukovina
Migrant boat disasters
February 1942 events